Mugiboogie is an album by Mugison, released in 2008 by Ipecac Recordings. Mugison recorded and mixed it together with Birgir Jón Birgisson in the Sundlaugin studio in Iceland.

Track listing 
All tracks written by Mugison.

 "Mugiboogie" – 3:56
 "The Pathetic Anthem" – 4:14
 "To the Bone" – 3:38
 "Jesus Is a Good Name to Moan" – 4:36
 "George Harrison" – 3:28
 "Deep Breathing" – 5:14
 "I'm Alright" – 2:32
 "The Animal" – 3:58
 "Two Thumb Sucking Son of a Boyo" – 3:46
 "The Great Unrest" – 4:30
 "My Love I Love" – 2:10
 "Sweetest Melody" – 6:56

Personnel 
 Mugison – vocals, guitar, jaw harp (listed as mouthorgan)
 Arnar Gislason – drums, backing vocals on "Sweetest Melody"
 Guðni Finnsson – bass, backing vocals on "Sweetest Melody"
 Davið Þór Jónsson – Hammond organ, Moog synthesizer, celesta, pump organ and all kinds of horns, backing vocals on "Sweetest Melody"
 Pétur Ben – guitar on "Mugiebooie", "Jesus Is a Good Name to Moan" and "Sweetest Melody", string arrangements on "Deep Breathing" and "The Great Unrest", backing vocals on "Sweetest Melody"
 Rúna Esradóttir – whispering on "The Pathetic Anthem"
 Helgi Hrafn Jónsson – trombone on "Mugieboogie"
 Björgvin Gislasson – guitar and sitar on "George Harrison" and "Sweetest Melody"
 Una Sveinbjarnardóttir, Zbigniew Dubnik, Pálína Árnadóttir, Gréta Guðnadóttir – violin on "Deep Breathing" and "The Great Unrest"
 Ótarrar Sæmundsen – double bass on "Deep Breathing" and "The Great Unrest"
 Guðmundur Kristmundsson, Þórarinn Már Baldursson – viola on "Deep Breathing" and "The Great Unrest"
 Sigurgeir Agnarsson, Margrét Árnadóttir – cello on "Deep Breathing" and "The Great Unrest"

Trivia 
 The poster for the European Tour was designed by Berlin-based design studio Zwölf.

References 

Mugison albums
2008 albums
Ipecac Recordings albums